Tillandsia carlos-hankii is a species of flowering plant in the genus Tillandsia. This species is endemic to Mexico.

References

carlos-hankii
Flora of Mexico